Missulena is a genus of mygalomorph spiders in the family Actinopodidae. It was first described by Charles Walckenaer in 1805, and is a senior synonym of Eriodon. M. tussulena is found in Chile, but the rest are indigenous to Australia.

They are sometimes referred to as "mouse spiders" from the now-disproven belief that they dig deep burrows similar to those of mice. Scotophaeus blackwalli is also called a "mouse spider", but it is smaller and not closely related.

Description 
They have a glossy carapace and high, broad heads with eyes spread out across the front of the head, and short spinnerets in the rear of the abdomen. They mostly prey on insects, though they may consume other small animals as opportunity presents. Their primary predators include wasps, centipedes, and scorpions.

These spiders also exhibit sexual dimorphism. Females are entirely black, while males coloration is specific to each species. For instance, male eastern mouse spiders (M. bradleyi) have a bluish patch, while male red-headed mouse spiders (M. occatoria) are brownish or blue-black with bright red-tinged jaws.

Identification 
They resemble most genera of the infraorder Mygalomorphae. But they can be easily distinguished by the large pair of chelicerae, their two small eyes in the center and 3 to the sides. While in all other trap door spiders they are grouped in a mound at the center of the head. Females are harder to identify than males, as females are entirely black, while males may be brighter in color. Usually in form of a blueish abdomen or reddish carapace and chelicerae, or both.

Habitat and range 
These spiders have a Gondwanan distribution, with one species found in Chile and the rest distributed throughout Australia. Females generally remain in their burrows, depending on the males to wander in search of mates.

Medical significance 
Bites from these spiders are painful, but not generally dangerous. Serious envenomations are relatively rare, but bites that have been documented in medical literature didn't require antivenom treatment or involve serious symptoms. There is evidence to suggest that a mouse spider bite can potentially be as serious as that of an Australian funnel-web spider, but recorded bites are rare, despite the abundance of some species amid human habitation.

These spiders look very similar to the Australian funnel web spiders and bites should be initially treated as funnel web spider bites until the spider is positively identified by an expert. Australian funnel-web spider antivenom has been found to be effective in treating severe mouse spider bites. Unlike the Australian funnel-web spiders, however, the mouse spider is far less aggressive towards humans, and may often bite without releasing any venom.

Species

 it contains 21 species:
M. bradleyi Rainbow, 1914 – Australia (New South Wales)
M. davidi Greenberg, Huey, Framenau & Harms, 2021 – Australia (Western Australia)
M. dipsaca Faulder, 1995 – Australia
M. faulderi Harms & Framenau, 2013 – Australia (Western Australia)
M. granulosa (O. Pickard-Cambridge, 1869) – Australia (Western Australia)
M. harewoodi Framenau & Harms, 2017 – Australia (Western Australia)
M. hoggi Womersley, 1943 – Australia (Western Australia)
M. insignis (O. Pickard-Cambridge, 1877) – Australia
M. iugum Greenberg, Huey, Framenau & Harms, 2021 – Australia (Western Australia)
M. langlandsi Harms & Framenau, 2013 – Australia (Western Australia)
M. leniae Miglio, Harms, Framenau & Harvey, 2014 – Australia (Western Australia)
M. mainae Miglio, Harms, Framenau & Harvey, 2014 – Australia (Western Australia)
M. manningensis Greenberg, Huey, Framenau & Harms, 2021 – Australia (Western Australia)
M. melissae Miglio, Harms, Framenau & Harvey, 2014 – Australia (Western Australia)
M. occatoria Walckenaer, 1805 – Southern Australia
M. pinguipes Miglio, Harms, Framenau & Harvey, 2014 – Australia (Western Australia)
M. pruinosa Levitt-Gregg, 1966 – Australia (Western Australia, Northern Territory)
M. reflexa Rainbow & Pulleine, 1918 – Australia (South Australia)
M. rutraspina Faulder, 1995 – Australia (Western Australia, South Australia, Victoria)
M. torbayensis Main, 1996 – Australia (Western Australia)
M. tussulena Goloboff, 1994 – Chile

Formerly included:
M. bonneti (Zapfe, 1961) (Transferred to Plesiolena)

See also
 List of Actinopodidae species

References

Further reading

 
Mygalomorphae genera
Taxa named by Charles Athanase Walckenaer
Spiders of Australia
Spiders of South America
Fauna of Chile